Charles Joseph Henry Corbett, BCL (1853 – 20 November 1935) was a British Liberal Party politician in the radical tradition who was part of a prominent family who supported women's rights.

Family
He was a son of C. J. Corbett of Thames Ditton. He married in 1881, Marie, daughter of George Gray of Tunbridge Wells. She was an English suffragist, local government worker and supporter of the Liberal Party. They had one son and two daughters, Cicely and Margery, an international feminist campaigner and Liberal Parliamentary candidate.

Legal career
He was educated at Marlborough College and New College, Oxford, and was subsequently called to the bar at the Middle Temple.

Political career

Parliament
Corbett was a Liberal candidate in East Grinstead in the elections of 1895 and 1900, but was unsuccessful. He sat as Liberal MP for East Grinstead Division of Sussex from 1906–January 1910, having been elected in the Liberal landslide win of 1906, when he became the first and only Liberal to win the division. He was defeated at the January 1910 General Election.

References
Who Was Who; http://www.ukwhoswho.com

External links

Who Was Who; http://www.ukwhoswho.com
Spartacus Educational; https://spartacus-educational.com/TUcorbett.htm
West Sussex Record Office blog; https://westsussexrecordofficeblog.com/2021/11/19/international-mens-day-2021-a-celebration-of-charles-corbett-campaigner-for-womens-rights/

1853 births
1935 deaths
Alumni of New College, Oxford
Liberal Party (UK) MPs for English constituencies
People educated at Marlborough College
People from East Grinstead
UK MPs 1906–1910